The Bachelor of Science in Hospitality & Catering Management also known as BSc. HCM is a qualification in Hotel studies. This degree is also sometimes known as BHM (Bachelor of Hospitality Management) or (Bachelor of Hotel Management) and is a very popular Academic degree all over the world.

A combination of Hospitality, Tourism, Management, Arts, Science & Technology are studied in the BSc. HCM Degree. The qualification enhances the ability of the holder to gain jobs in the hospitality industry, of which hotels are an important part.

Graduate degrees
Several large corporations involved with the hospitality industry, and management companies offer internship programs, management training programs, and direct placements into many operational, non-operational departments of hospitality and tourism sector for students studying or qualified in hospitality and tourism management.

See also
 American Hotel & Lodging Educational Institute
 Confederation of Tourism and Hospitality
 Hospitality
 Hotel manager
 MICE

References 

Hospitality management